Endri Vinter (born 23 February 1993) is an Estonian swimmer.

He was born in Pärnu. In 2017 he graduated from the University of Tartu's Pärnu College in enterprise and project management specialty.

He began his swimming career in 2001. His coaches have been Eve Leppik, Marika and Artur Tikkerbär. He is multiple-times Estonian champion in different swimming disciplines. 2010–2016 he was a member of Estonian national swimming team.

References

Living people
1993 births
Estonian male backstroke swimmers
Estonian male freestyle swimmers
University of Tartu alumni
Sportspeople from Pärnu
21st-century Estonian people